Aminu Muhammad Ahmad, also known as Aminu Saira (born 20 April 1979) is a Nigerian filmmaker, director and story writer. He is regarded as a pioneer revolutionist of today's Kannywood and a filmmaker in the Kannywood movie industry.

He became known after the release of his movie Jamila Da Jamilu in 2009, Ga Duhu Ga Haske in 2010 and Ashabul Kahfi in 2014, which earned him several honors and awards, including Best Director of the Year (Jurors Choice Awards) in 2014. After the release of Ashabul Kahfi, Saira began a project to launch the first Hausa home video series in the history of the Hausa movie industry, Labarina, which is now the best trending home video in Kannywood.

Ashabul Kahfi and Baya Da Kura were the two highest-grossing films of all times for Saira Movies respectively. In 2016, Aminu was named best Kannywood director of all times and one of the highest paid in the history of Kannywood movie industry. He is also the director of the most popular TV series film Labarina in 2020.

Early life
Aminu was born in Gwammaja, Kano State, Nigeria, the son of Muhammad, an elderly statesman. Mohammed grew up in the Kano metropolis with his two brothers, who are all Kannywood followers, and got his primary, secondary and tertiary educations in Kano. He studied Quranic Science in Aminu Kano College of Islamic And Legal Studies, Kano, Nigeria. Aminu quits his job as a businessman to enter the Kannywood film industry in 2006 with his first movie, Musnadi, that hits the industry.

Early career
Aminu Saira was the director, writer and producer for Dare Da Yawa in (2007), and Jamila Da Jamilu in (2009) and his all-time favourite Ga Duhu Ga Haske in (2010), which featured a non-Muslim who converted to Islam. He continued to write and direct movies, including his first and one of the best Hausa movie series, Labarina, under his production name, Saira Movies.

Influence

Aminu Saira's way of life has made him to be an extraordinary person within the Kannywood movie industry. Hadiza Aliyu described Aminu Saira as her superstar. Nafisa Abdullahi described him as one of her mentors. His influence was increased within the movie industry after the release of his movie Sarauta in 2011, which increased Ali Nuhu's career and later continued his dominance after the release of Daga Ni Sai Ke and Ya Daga Allah in 2014.

Filmography 
Aminu Saira filmography

Honors and awards

In recognition of a distinguished career as a Nigerian filmmaker, Saira was also awarded the best director by several other media outlets, including Arewa Music and Movies Awards.

See also
 List of Nigerian actors
 List of Nigerian film directors
 List of Kannywood actors

References

External links
 .

1979 births
Nigerian male film actors
Hausa-language mass media
Living people
Male actors in Hausa cinema
21st-century Nigerian male actors
People from Kano State
Kannywood actors
Nigerian male television actors
Hausa people
Nigerian film award winners
Nigerian film directors
Actors from Kano State
Nigerian screenwriters
Nigerian entertainment industry businesspeople
Nigerian media personalities
20th-century births